Umbilia oriettae is a species of sea snail, a cowry, a marine gastropod mollusk in the family Cypraeidae, the cowries.

Description

Distribution

References

External links

Cypraeidae
Gastropods described in 2005